St. Charles High School may refer to one of several schools in the United States:

St. Charles East High School, public school in St. Charles, Illinois
St. Charles North High School, public school in St. Charles, Illinois
St. Charles High School, Waldorf school in Charles County Public Schools system, Maryland
St. Charles High School (Minnesota), public school in St. Charles, Minnesota
St. Charles High School (Missouri), public school in St. Charles, Missouri
St. Charles West High School, public school in St. Charles, Missouri
Saint Charles Preparatory School, Catholic private school in Columbus, Ohio

See also
Saint Charles (disambiguation)